Sonder is the fourth studio album by English progressive metal band, Tesseract. It was released on 20 April 2018 through Kscope, following Polaris (2015).

Tesseract began recording the album in 2017, releasing its first single, "Smile", on 23 June, with the intention of reworking it for Sonder. The album's lead single, "Luminary", was released on 8 February 2018, the same day the album was announced. It is notably the band's first full-length release to not feature a lineup change from the previous album.

Background 

Sonder marks Tesseract's second consecutive release and third overall with the original vocalist, Daniel Tompkins, who first appeared on their debut studio album, One (2011), and later, Polaris. A concept album, Sonder was described by Tompkins as "exploring a deep and devouring sense of insignificance". "Smile" was released by the band on 23 June 2017, and was described as their "most collaborative track in recent times", but was intended to be reworked and extended for the album.

The album was originally announced on 8 February 2018, with the simultaneous release of its lead single, "Luminary", and the music video for "King" (directed by Kyle Kadow and Steven Cleavland in Wisconsin) being released on 16 March. For the first time, the band acquired the talents of a choir, produced and conducted by Randy Slaugh of White Moth Black Butterfly and recorded at Soularium Studios in the U.S. 
 Sonder is the band's shortest studio album at 36 minutes in length.

The inspiration for the album's name came from a fictional word used in The Dictionary of Obscure Sorrows.

Track listing

Personnel

Tesseract 
 Acle Kahney – guitars
 James Monteith – guitars
 Jay Postones – drums
 Daniel Tompkins – vocals
 Amos Williams – bass, cover art

Additional personnel 
 Aidan O'Brien – production, engineering
 Acle Kahney – production, recording, mixing and mastering
 Randy Slaugh – choir production, conducting

Charts

References 

2018 albums
Kscope albums
Tesseract (band) albums
Concept albums